This is a list of people who have served as lord lieutenant for Staffordshire. Since 1828, all lord lieutenants have also been custos rotulorum of Staffordshire.

Lord Lieutenants of Staffordshire

Henry Stafford, 1st Baron Stafford 1559
George Talbot, 6th Earl of Shrewsbury 3 July 1585 – 18 November 1590
vacant
Robert Devereux, 3rd Earl of Essex 29 February 1612 – 17 July 1627
Robert Carey, 1st Earl of Monmouth 17 July 1627 – 3 February 1629
Robert Devereux, 3rd Earl of Essex 3 February 1629 – 1642
Interregnum
Robert Greville, 4th Baron Brooke 13 August 1660 – 17 February 1677
James Scott, 1st Duke of Monmouth 24 March 1677 – 12 December 1679
Robert Spencer, 2nd Earl of Sunderland 12 December 1679 – 2 September 1681
Charles Talbot, 12th Earl of Shrewsbury 2 September 1681 – 2 September 1687
Robert Shirley, 1st Earl Ferrers 2 September 1687 – 19 November 1687
Walter Aston, 3rd Lord Aston of Forfar 19 November 1687 – 21 March 1689
William Paget, 6th Baron Paget 21 March 1689 – 26 February 1713
Henry Paget, 1st Earl of Uxbridge March 1713 – 28 October 1715
Henry Newport, 3rd Earl of Bradford 28 October 1715 – 27 April 1725
Washington Shirley, 2nd Earl Ferrers 27 April 1725 – 14 April 1729
vacant
Henry Shirley, 3rd Earl Ferrers May 1731 – 16 July 1742
John Leveson-Gower, 1st Earl Gower 23 July 1742 – 25 December 1754
Granville Leveson-Gower, 1st Marquess of Stafford 22 January 1755 – 21 October 1799
George Leveson-Gower, Earl Gower 21 October 1799 – 6 June 1801
Henry Bayly Paget, 1st Earl of Uxbridge 6 June 1801 – 13 March 1812
Charles Chetwynd-Talbot, 2nd Earl Talbot 13 April 1812 – 13 January 1849
Henry Paget, 1st Marquess of Anglesey 3 February 1849 – 29 April 1854
Edward Littleton, 1st Baron Hatherton 18 May 1854 – 4 May 1863
Thomas Anson, 2nd Earl of Lichfield 19 June 1863 – 14 July 1871
Arthur Wrottesley, 3rd Baron Wrottesley 14 July 1871 – 18 March 1887
William Legge, 5th Earl of Dartmouth 18 March 1887 – 4 August 1891
William Legge, 6th Earl of Dartmouth 19 October 1891 – 6 May 1927
John Ryder, 5th Earl of Harrowby 6 May 1927 – 18 January 1948
Harold Wallace-Copeland 18 January 1948 – 16 August 1968
Sir Arthur Bryan 16 August 1968 – 6 September 1993
Sir James Appleton Hawley 6 September 1993 – 29 March 2012
Ian Dudson 29 March 2012 – present

Deputy lieutenants
A deputy lieutenant of Staffordshire is commissioned by the Lord Lieutenant of Staffordshire. Deputy lieutenants support the work of the lord-lieutenant. There can be several deputy lieutenants at any time, depending on the population of the county. Their appointment does not terminate with the changing of the lord-lieutenant, but they usually retire at age 75.

19th Century
28 July 1834: James Bateman, Esq.

References
 

Staffordshire